Kalinda Howarth (born 2 August 1999) is an Australian rules footballer playing for the Gold Coast Suns in the AFL Women's (AFLW). Howarth is a dual Gold Coast leading goalkicker and was named in the 2020 AFL Women's All-Australian team.

Early life
Howarth was born on the Gold Coast into a family of Indigenous Australian (Yuin) descent and attended Helensvale State High School throughout her upbringing. She grew up a passionate rugby league supporter and played touch rugby, soccer and basketball throughout her childhood. At the age of 12, her brother convinced her to try Australian rules football with the Southport Sharks. She later switched clubs to play for Labrador and eventually Coolangatta Tweed in the top level Queensland competition in the lead up to her draft year. At the age of 17, Howarth kicked the premiership-winning goal for Coolangatta Tweed in the 2016 QAFLW grand final. She was also named on the half forward line in the 2017 Under 18 All-Australian team following her strong performance at the national championships.

Howarth named Lance Franklin as her football idol growing up and wears the number 23 guernsey in recognition of her desire to play like him.

AFL Women's career

Brisbane and return to QAFLW (2018–2019)
Howarth was selected by the Brisbane Lions with the 31st pick in the 2017 AFL Women's draft but was delisted a year later without making her AFLW debut. She then joined Bond University and impressed with 31 goals in 15 games to win the QAFLW leading goal kicker award for 2019 and finish in second place in the league best and fairest voting. Her performance led to draft pre-selection by her hometown team, the Gold Coast Suns, to be a part of their inaugural 2020 AFLW list.

Gold Coast (2020–present)
She made her AFL Women's debut against Greater Western Sydney in round 1 of the 2020 AFL Women's season. In the inaugural women's QClash between intra-state rivals Gold Coast and Brisbane, Howarth kicked three of the Suns' four goals against her former side and drew comparisons to legendary Geelong forward Steve Johnson following her performance. She was also named the AFLW's Round 3 AFL Women’s Rising Star nominee for her efforts. Three weeks later, Howarth kicked a career-high four goals and was voted best on ground in her team's 25-point win over the West Coast Eagles, which ultimately secured a place in the Finals for the Suns. She was named in the 2020 AFLW All-Australian team for her season performance.

Statistics
Updated to the end of S7 (2022).

|-
| 2018 ||  || 19
| 0 || — || — || — || — || — || — || — || — || — || — || — || — || — || — || 0
|-
| 2020 ||  || 23
| 7 || 9 || 2 || 54 || 17 || 71 || 10 || 16 || 1.3 || 0.3 || 7.7 || 2.4 || 10.1 || 1.4 || 2.3 || 4
|-
| 2021 ||  || 23
| 9 || 3 || 3 || 82 || 23 || 105 || 23 || 10 || 0.3 || 0.3 || 9.1 || 2.6 || 11.7 || 2.6 || 1.1 || 3
|-
| 2022 ||  || 23
| 9 || 2 || 3 || 74 || 23 || 97 || 25 || 17 || 0.2 || 0.3 || 8.2 || 2.6 || 10.8 || 2.8 || 1.9 || 0
|-
| S7 (2022) ||  || 23
| 9 || 6 || 7 || 79 || 21 || 100 || 23 || 18 || 0.7 || 0.8 || 8.8 || 2.3 || 11.1 || 2.6 || 2.0 || 5
|- class=sortbottom
! colspan=3 | Career
! 34 !! 20 !! 15 !! 289 !! 84 !! 373 !! 81 !! 61 !! 0.6 !! 0.4 !! 8.5 !! 2.5 !! 11.0 !! 2.4 !! 1.8 !! 12
|}

Honours and achievements
 AFL Women's All-Australian team: 2020
 2× Gold Coast leading goalkicker: 2020, 2021
 AFL Women's Rising Star nominee: 2020
 AFL Women's 22under22 team: 2020

References

External links
 
 
 

1999 births
Living people
Sportspeople from the Gold Coast, Queensland
Sportswomen from Queensland
Indigenous Australian players of Australian rules football
Australian rules footballers from Queensland
Gold Coast Football Club (AFLW) players
20th-century Australian women
21st-century Australian women